Franz Krüger (10 September 1797, in Großbadegast, Köthen, Anhalt – 21 January 1857, in Berlin), known as Pferde-Krüger ("Horse-Krüger"), was a German (Prussian) painter and lithographer. He was best known for his romantic and lively portraits and pictures of horses, which made him the most in demand military and portrait painter in Berlin. His paintings of military parades and hundreds of portraits led to him painting many of the "well to do" of the city.

Life 
Krüger was the son of a nobleman, and his friendship with the ornithologist Johann Friedrich Naumann from the neighbouring town of Ziebigk led him into animal painting. During his school days in Dessau he came into contact with the landscape painter . Krüger studied in 1812–13 at the Prussian Academy of Arts in Berlin, and then continued to hone his skills independently by drawing from life, particularly in the Prussian royal stables. In 1818 his military and hunting paintings were exhibited at the academy for the first time. His painting of Prince Augustus of Prussia (a son of Prince Augustus Ferdinand of Prussia) and Count Neidhardt von Gneisenau laid the foundations for his fame as a portraitist and also led to further depictions of the royal family.

In 1825 he was named a Royal Professor and full member of the Academy of Arts. Many trips to the Russian court in St. Petersburg and the courts in Hanover and Schwerin followed. During a study trip to Paris in 1846, he met Eugène Delacroix. After the revolutions of 1848, he returned to Dessau, but in 1855, he took part in the World Exhibition in Paris.

In 1825, he married an artist called Johanna Eunicke. She died in 1856. He died the year after, and was buried at Dorotheenstadt cemetery in Berlin.

One of his students was the animal painter Carl Steffeck.

Literature 
Max Osborn: Franz Krüger. Edited and with a foreword by Kerstin Englert. Berlin: Gebr. Mann, 1997  (New issue of a book of 1910)

External links

1797 births
1857 deaths
People from Südliches Anhalt
19th-century German painters
19th-century German male artists
German male painters
German printmakers